Feliz! is an annual television special that airs every New Year's Eve on SIN/Univision,  In every edition, the show has musical guests, special celebrity appearances, and as always, the sixty second countdown to the next year and as the show progresses, more cities joined in on the festivities in addition to Times Square and Miami including San Juan and, Acapulco ¡Feliz 2006!, San Juan and Mexico City ¡Feliz 2010!, Anaheim ¡Feliz 2011!, Orlando ¡Feliz 2015!, San Antonio and Las Vegas ¡Feliz 2017!.

History
The Spanish-language networks also joined in on the celebration. SIN/Univision's coverage of the event is called ¡Feliz (Year Number)! hosted by Don Francisco from Sábado Gigante. It became the biggest New Year's Eve program on the network since its original run and it currently airs at 10:00pm since 1986. For ¡Feliz 2006!, the show starts after Sábado Gigante at a special time of 7:00pm instead of the original 8:00pm time slot to finish 2005. ¡Feliz 2009! only covers the New York City at EST portion of the program. in 2011 for the first time ever Univision Communications was announcement to Live from Disneyland Resort at PST for ¡Feliz 2011!. ¡Feliz 2017! was on air at 3:00pm to though 9:00pm at finish 2016 including Los Angeles, California, U.S., Hong Kong, China, Dubai, UAE , Baghdad, Iraq, Cairo, Egypt, Moscow, Russia, Berlin, Germany, London, England, UK, and Rio de Janeiro, Brazil.
 
Pitbull participated in the 2018 edition, after his own Pitbull's New Year's Revolution special for Fox was cancelled.

For the 2022 edition, Raul de Molina and Lili Estefan have decided to not broadcast from Times Square due to unknown reasons, but they would return for the 2023 edition.

Years
The Eastern/Central feed is broadcast live while the Mountain/Pacific feed is tape-delayed.

References

External links

Annual television shows
New Year's television specials
Times Square
Disneyland Resort
Las Vegas